Bayandayevsky District (Baiandain aimag) is an administrative district of Ust-Orda Buryat Okrug of Irkutsk Oblast, Russia, one of the thirty-three in the oblast. Municipally, it is incorporated as Bayandayevsky Municipal District. It is located in the south of the oblast. Its administrative center is the rural locality (a selo) of Bayanday. Population:  13,730 (2002 Census);  The population of Bayanday accounts for 23.2% of the district's total population.

References

Sources

Registry of the Administrative-Territorial Formations of Irkutsk Oblast 

Districts of Irkutsk Oblast